Level 16 is a 2018 Canadian science fiction horror film written and directed by Danishka Esterhazy. It follows a group of girls who live at a "school" which educates them about how to be perfect young women for families that they are told will eventually adopt them. Two girls work together to uncover the truth about their captivity.

The plot and overall premise of the film shows many similarities to the 2005 film The Island and Kazuo Ishiguro's 2005 novel Never Let Me Go.

Plot
In an isolated, windowless boarding school run with military precision, girls live on numbered levels and are taught to follow the "feminine virtues" of obedience and cleanliness and avoid "vices" like anger and curiosity. The girls are told that the school protects them from the toxic outside air and that their lessons prepare them for adoption by members of high society, who will only want the girls if they are "clean." Breaking the rules results in being taken downstairs for punishment, which the girls universally fear. Two best friends, Sophia and Vivien, line up with the other girls on Level 10 to wash their faces in front of a camera in an allotted, regimented time. Vivien steps out of line to help Sophia, who dropped her jar of face cream, and in doing so exceeds her time limit. The guards arrive and Vivien is dragged away for punishment, screaming in terror.

Years later, Vivien is moved to Level 16 (the final level) and reunited with Sophia for the first time since Level 10. Sophia warns her not to take the daily vitamins, which are actually powerful sedatives. That night, while pretending to sleep, Vivien and another girl, Olivia, are carried to a lounge. The facility manager, Miss Brixil, presents the sleeping girls to an aging couple, who choose Olivia and make plans to purchase her. Once the girls are returned to the dormitory, Vivien manages to escape into the hall, but finds that the outer door requires key card access. Throughout the night, several other girls are taken to the lounge and subsequently returned. Miss Brixil, talking to an unseen person on the phone, expresses concern about the behavior of a guard, Alex, warning that he should not be allowed around the girls unsupervised.

The girls meet the facility’s doctor, Dr. Miro, who informs them that there has been a fever going around some of the other halls and gives them a 'vaccine.' The injection gives them painful rashes and causes one girl to have a seizure. Miro initially acts kind towards Vivien, but when she attempts to share her concerns with him, he realizes she has been skipping her vitamins and injects her with a 'concentrated' dose. Sophia informs Vivien that Alex, the guard Miss Brixil was concerned about, secretly visits the dormitory and "touches" the girls while they sleep. She plans to wait until Alex comes to the dormitory, restrain him, and steal his key card. Shortly afterwards, Ava reports Vivien for unclean behavior and Vivien is locked in a box for the night. That night, Sophia attacks Alex when he comes to the dormitory and steals his key card, but she is captured before she is able to free Vivien.

Miss Brixil and Miro inform the girls that they were unable to find the key card Sophia stole and ask where she hid it. When they cannot produce it, Rita is taken downstairs for punishment with a warning to the group that another girl will be punished each day until the card is found. Alone, Miss Brixil and Miro discuss the school’s dwindling funds and the pressure being put on them (ostensibly by powerful criminals) to produce results. During the night, Vivien finds that Sophia hid the key card behind her headboard and escapes, heading downstairs to rescue her. She frees Sophia, and they enter a crude operating room full of corpses, where they find the missing Rita, dead and with her skin removed. Vivien insists they leave immediately, but Sophia refuses to go without the other girls. While Sophia goes to get them, Vivien finds a video in the lounge revealing that the facility is actually a rejuvenation clinic run by Miro – the girls are raised in a sterile environment so that their skin can eventually be transplanted onto rich buyers.

Sophia tries to warn the other girls about their situation, but they are initially suspicious of her. Vivien brings Miss Brixil to the rest of the group, where she reveals that Sophia is telling the truth. After locking Miss Brixil in the box, they lead the girls out of the facility, closely pursued by the guards. During a fight, Sophia is injured, but the two narrowly escape by hiding in a shed behind a security door. When the guards are unable to open the door, Miro arrives and attempts to manipulate Vivien into coming outside and helping him round up the other girls, revealing that their birth parents sold them to the facility as babies. Vivien, aware that Miro only cares about her appearance, cuts her face with the scalpel while Miro watches, distraught. Soon afterwards, henchmen lead Miro away to see their boss, the mastermind of the operation. A gunshot is heard; Miro has presumably been killed for losing control of the clinic. An exhausted Sophia and Vivien fall asleep inside the shed. They awaken the next morning to the door being broken down by Belarusian police and emergency service workers, who have already found the other girls. Sophia and Vivien are led to safety and hold hands while they experience rain and sunlight for the first time in their lives.

Cast
 Katie Douglas as Vivien
 Sara DaSilva as young Vivien
 Celina Martin as Sophia
 Lori Phun as young Sophia
 Peter Outerbridge as Dr. Miro
 Sara Canning as Miss Brixil
 Alexis Whelan as Ava
 Amalia Williamson as Rita

Production

Filming
Filming took place in a former police station in Toronto that was built in the 1930s. Esterhazy was given complete freedom to use and adjust the building in any way she saw fit, and used this to create a "very real and gritty" set.

The film was slated to have its television premiere on August 24, 2019 on CBC Television.

Casting
The role of Doctor Miro was portrayed by Peter Outerbridge, an actor who director Danishka Esterhazy had admired for years. Sara Canning, a friend of Esterhazy who played the lead part on her first feature film Black Field, was cast as Brixil in a role that was specifically written for her by Esterhazy. Katie Douglas, who was cast as Vivien, was a young emerging actress who impressed upon her first audition. Of Douglas's performances, Esterhazy said "Every day on set she would surprise me — in the very best way."

References

External links 
 
 
 
 Level 16 at Library and Archives Canada

2010s science fiction thriller films
2018 films
English-language Canadian films
Films shot in Toronto
Canadian science fiction thriller films
2010s English-language films
2010s Canadian films